Unshelved is a daily comic strip set in a public library. Published by Overdue Media, the webcomic was created by writer Gene Ambaum, a librarian, and co-writer/artist Bill Barnes, and has been appearing at the rate of a strip per day since February 16, 2002, with a virtual circulation in excess of 45,000 readers via RSS feed, website and email subscription. Beginning on February 29, 2016, Chris Hallbeck took over as the illustrator. Hallbeck had previously been a guest illustrator for over a year. On April 29, Barnes announced that he had also left as co-writer of the strip. It is part of the Create a Comic Project. On October 10, 2016, it was announced that the final comic strip would be released on November 9. Bill Barnes returned to draw and co-author the final week of strips.

References

External links 
Unshelved

2000s webcomics
2010s webcomics
Webcomics in print
Library science publications
Works set in libraries
2002 webcomic debuts
Workplace webcomics
American comedy webcomics